The Valley of Elah or Ella Valley ("the valley of the terebinth"; from the  Emek HaElah), called in , Wadi es-Sunt, is a long, shallow valley in Israel and the West Bank best known as the place described in the Hebrew Bible (or Old Testament of Christianity) where the Israelites were encamped when David fought Goliath. It is home to several important archaeological sites, including those identified as the ancient towns of Azekah and Socho. Rising up from the valley on its extreme southeast end lies the hilltop ruin Adullam, and on its north lie the ruins of the ancient fortress city of Khirbet Qeiyafa, which is identified with the ancient town of Sha'araim.

The valley is named after the large and shady terebinth trees (Pistacia atlantica) which are indigenous to it. On the west side of the valley, near Socho, there is a very large and ancient tree of this kind,  in height with a trunk  in circumference and a canopy at least  in diameter. This tree is notable for being one of the largest terebinths in the area, and marks the upper end of the valley.

Since the early 1970s, the valley has also contained a large satellite relay station, with an antenna farm containing some 120 satellite dishes of various sizes. From 2010 to 2014, the region around the valley was believed to be threatened by shale oil extraction through the CCR ground-heating process, with the Green Zionist Alliance and the grassroots group Save Adullam, among others, working to stop exploitation of the region. The plan was ultimately blocked in 2014 by a zoning committee decision. In July 2019, the Elah Valley came under the Israel Nature and Parks Authority, owing largely to its historical importance and the desire to curtail the encroaching city limits of Beit Shemesh to its north.

History
In 2009, Professor Yosef Garfinkel discovered a fortified city from the Iron Age II dated sometime between 1050 and 915 BC at Khirbet Qeiyafa, southwest of Jerusalem in the Elah Valley. The fortifications have been said to support the biblical account of the United Monarchy, the theory that Israel in the time of King David at the beginning of Iron Age II was more than simply a tribal chiefdom. Others are skeptical and suggest it might represent either a Judahite or Canaanite fortress.
In the late 19th century, Claude Conder and Herbert Kitchener described the Elah Valley as being "one of the most fertile districts in Palestine. It is an open flat vale about half a mile across, and covered with corn; a narrow trench runs down the center full of white pebbles worn by the water in winter. Here and there large terebinths grow along its course (Butmet Wâdy es Sûr), and solitary oak trees (Ballûtet Kŭssis). On either side rise the stony hills covered with brushwood and wild growth."

Flora and fauna

Numerous plant species are native to the Elah Valley, including:

 Terebinth (Pistacia terebinthus)
 Kermes oak (Quercus calliprinos)
 Buckthorn (Rhamnus lycioides)
 Carob (Ceratonia siliqua)
 Sweet marjoram (Majorana syriaca; syn. Origanum syriacum)
 Sage (Salvia fruticosa)
 Toothpick (Ammi visnaga)
 Florence fennel (Foeniculum vulgare)
 Anemone (Anemone coronaria)
 Cyclamen (Cyclamen persicum)
 Lupine (Lupinus pilosus)
 Daisy (Glebionis coronaria)
 Syrian cornflower-thistle (Centaurea cyanoides) – rare
 Mallow (Malva nicaeensis)
 Asparagus (Asparagus palaestinus)
 Chicory (Cichorium pumilum; syn. Cichorium endivia)
 Broom lettuce (Lactuca serriola)
 Stinging nettle (Urtica urens)
 Asphodel (Asphodelus aestivus)
 Wild oat (Avena sterilis)
 Wild barley (Hordeum spontaneum; syn. H. ithaburense)
 Wild mustard (Sinapsis alba)
 Arum; cuckoo-pint (Arum palaestinum)
 Caper (Capparis spinosa)
 Wild carrot (Daucus carota)
 Globe-thistle (Echinops adenocaulos)
 Ciliate vetchling (Lathyrus blepharicarpus)
 Spiny broom (Calicotome villosa)

Animal species native to the Elah Valley include:

 Mountain gazelle (Gazella gazella)
 Golden jackal (Canis aureus syriacus)
 Syrian fox (Vulpes thaleb)
 Crested porcupine (Hystrix cristata)
 Egyptian mongoose (Herpestes ichneumon)
 Hedgehog (Erinaceus concolor)
 Middle East blind mole-rat (Spalax ehrenbergi; syn. Nannospalax ehrenbergi)
 Spur-thighed tortoise (Testudo graeca)
 Günther's vole (Microtus guentheri)
 Legless lizard (Pseudopus apodus)

See also
 Battle of Ajnadayn
 In the Valley of Elah

References

External links

1 Samuel Chapter 17
The Valley of Elah
Porcupines, Emperors, and the New Middle East
Ellah Valley (HD)

Gallery 

 
Elah
Land of Israel
Valleys of Israel
Valleys of the West Bank
Ancient Israel and Judah
District of Jerusalem
Mateh Yehuda Regional Council
Goliath